Mylène Jampanoï (born Lena Jam-Panoï on 12 July 1980) is a French actress, model, and visual artist. Her first leading role was in the drama film The Chinese Botanist's Daughters (2006). She subsequently garnered international attention for her role in Pascal Laugier's controversial horror film Martyrs (2008).

She later had a supporting role in Clint Eastwood's Hereafter (2010), and starred as Bambou in the Serge Gainsbourg biopic, Gainsbourg: A Heroic Life (also 2010). Other film credits include the American animated film Kung Fu Panda (2008), the Canadian drama Laurence Anyways (2012), and the Netflix-produced Madame Claude (2021).

In addition to her acting and modeling career, Jampanoï is also a painter whose works have been exhibited at Paris's Galerie Sobering.

Early life
Mylène Jampanoï was born Lena Jam-Panoï on 12 July 1980 in Aix-en-Provence, Bouches-du-Rhône, France to a Chinese father and a French-Breton mother. Her father, who immigrated to France from China through Vietnam, abandoned the family when she was three years old, and later established a prosperous textile business in Canada.

Jampanoï was raised by her mother, who worked as a cashier at the food retailer Rallye. As a teenager, Jampanoï fled her family home due to her mother's severe depression, and lived with her boyfriend in a Paris squat. She eventually returned to her family home in Aix-en-Provence to complete her education, earning a scientific baccalauréat at age 17. While still a teenager, she was taken under the wing of a 35-year-old male attorney in Aix-en-Provence, who became her mentor. After she earned her baccalauréat, he urged her to pursue a career in law, but she instead relocated again to Paris to pursue acting and modeling.

Career
After appearing in the French television series Sous le soleil, Jampanoï had a minor part in the action thriller Crimson Rivers II: Angels of the Apocalypse (2004), followed by a supporting role in 36th Precinct (also 2004), a crime thriller starring Daniel Auteuil and Gérard Depardieu. She was then cast in the independent drama film Valley of Flowers (2006). Next, Jampanoï starred in the drama The Chinese Botanist's Daughters (2006), a role which necessitated her to phonetically learn Chinese. In 2007, she became the face of Dior Snow cosmetics in Asia for LVMH and travelled to Japan and South Korea to represent the brand. She subsequently appeared on the cover of Asian Elle magazine.

Jampanoï gained international attention for her role in Pascal Laugier's controversial horror film Martyrs (2008), which was filmed in Montreal. Jampanoï took the role against the advice of her agent, and later stated that making the film was emotionally difficult due to its extreme content: "Every night when I went back to my room, I just cried, because I was so physically and psychologically tired. All my scenes [were] violent." Also in 2008, she had a minor voice role in the American animated comedy film Kung Fu Panda as Maître Vipère. Next, she appeared in the French mockumentary film The Ball of Actresses (2009), directed by Maïwenn, and in 2010, had a supporting role in Clint Eastwood's drama Hereafter, playing a news reporter. The same year, she starred in the Serge Gainsbourg biopic Gainsbourg: A Heroic Life, portraying actress Bambou.

In 2017, Jampanoï guest-starred on the Apple TV-UK series Kill Skills, and reprised her role in the film sequel of the series, Kill Skills 2 (2018). She subsequently had a central role in Made in China (2019), a comedy film about a French-Chinese family preparing for a wedding, directed by Julien Abraham. She then had a supporting role in the Netflix-released Madame Claude (2021), a biopic about French brothel owner Madame Claude.

In addition to acting, Jampanoï is also a visual artist, whose paintings were exhibited in the spring of 2022 at the Paris Galerie Sobering, as part of the Athènes n'est pas en Grèce ( English: Athens is not in Greece) show.

Personal life
Jampanoï married Indian supermodel and actor Milind Soman in Goa in 2006. They met during the shooting of their film Valley of Flowers. The two divorced in 2009. 

In the summer of 2014, she gave birth to a son, Andrèas Vassily, with her longtime partner, Greek producer Dimitri Stephanides. 

Jampanoï is a Roman Catholic, and was baptised in the church in 2015, though she has expressed criticism of the church's clerical celibacy policies. She also stated her support of the legalization of same-sex marriage in France.

Filmography

Film

Television

References

External links

 
 

1980 births
French film actresses
French female models
French people of Chinese descent
French people of Breton descent
French Roman Catholics
French television actresses
French women painters
Living people
People from Aix-en-Provence
21st-century French actresses
21st-century French painters